Alfred Charles Schultz was a member of the Wisconsin State Assembly.

Biography
Schultz was born on January 20, 1872, in Bartlett, Illinois. He married Alma Katherine Schmidt on June 25, 1896, in Bartlett. He later resided in Bruce, Wisconsin.

Career
Schultz was elected to the Assembly in 1924 and 1926. Additionally he was a member of the Platteville, Wisconsin City Council and a member and Chairman of the Platteville Board of Education (similar to school board). Schultz was also Chairman of Atlanta, Wisconsin and a member of the Rusk County, Wisconsin Board of Supervisors. He was a Republican.

References

Politicians from Cook County, Illinois
People from Platteville, Wisconsin
People from Rusk County, Wisconsin
Republican Party members of the Wisconsin State Assembly
Wisconsin city council members
County supervisors in Wisconsin
School board members in Wisconsin
1872 births
Year of death missing